Jane's IAF: Israeli Air Force (In Hebrew: כוכב כחול, Kochav Kachol, lit. "Blue Star") is a military jet aircraft Combat flight simulation video game released in 1998. The simulation was created by the Israeli software developer Pixel Multimedia and was released under the Jane's Combat Simulations line from Electronic Arts.

Plot 
The game, which is set in the Middle East, featured a single campaign mode which included several missions and a Massively Multiplayer Online Arena. There were two type of campaigns; the first type of campaigns featured recreations of several historic operations of the IAF such as the 1967 Six-Day War, the 1973 Yom Kippur War, and the 1982 Lebanon War. The second types of campaigns featured several fictional futuristic operations with Iraq, Syria, and Lebanon.

Gameplay 
Between the years 1998 and 2002 a player of the game could log onto Jane's Combat.Net website and find other potential players to play multiplayer games against. The Multiplayer version of the game featured an "All-Out-War" mission or "Teamplay" (two teams against each other). There were also two additional aircraft which were available only in the multiplayer mode - the MiG-23 and MiG-29. The game can also be played with others over a LAN.

Critical reception 

Robin G. Kim of Computer Gaming World said that while the game wasn't the most accurate of flight simulators, it had adequate "realism and manageable complexity". Meanwhile, T. Liam McDonald of GameSpot felt it was a worthy successor to Navy Fighters and ATF.

See also 
Falcon 4.0

References

External links 

Game demo at Internet Archive

1998 video games
Combat flight simulators
Jane's Combat Simulations
Electronic Arts games
Video games developed in Israel
Video games with historical settings
Windows games
Windows-only games
Multiplayer and single-player video games
Video games set in the Middle East
Video games set in Israel